The West Jefferson Avenue–Rouge River Bridge is a bridge located where Jefferson Avenue crosses the Rouge River at the border of Detroit and River Rouge, Michigan. It is the only surviving pony truss bascule bridge in the state of Michigan. It was listed on the National Register of Historic Places in 2000.

History

Before the current bridges crossing the Rouge River at West Jefferson and Fort Streets were built, the two crossings were served by narrow swing bridges. By the late 1910s, these spans urgently needed replacing, in large part because they interfered with the Federal government's plans to dredge the Rouge River to provide freighter access to the Ford River Rouge Complex. Both the city of Detroit (who was responsible for maintaining the bridges) and Wayne County agreed that the county could better oversee the construction, but legal restrictions prohibited county involvement until state law was changed in 1919.

With the new legislation in place, plans were drawn up in 1920 for a "Chicago city type of single trunnion, double-leaf bascule bridge" for each bridge. The cost for the pair of bridges was estimated at $2 million. A bond issue to fund construction was approved by Wayne County voters, and an alternate route onto which Jefferson Avenue traffic could be shunted was devised. Wayne County obtained an old truss, originally used by the Michigan Central Railroad upstream of Jefferson, and floated it downstream to a location 200 yards north of Jefferson. The old Jefferson Avenue bridge was closed and the detour opened on November 13, 1920.

Construction on the bridge commenced immediately. Wayne County contracted with the Missouri Valley Bridge and Iron Company of Leavenworth, Kansas, to build the substructure for $408,280; with the Strobel Steel Construction Company of Chicago to build the superstructure for $378,005; Cooper-Widenmann Construction Company of Detroit to build the operators' houses for $78,700; and Fowler Electrical Supply Company of Toledo, Ohio, to supply electrical equipment for $34,809. County crews graded and paved the approaches.

On August 21, 1922, the two bascule leaves were lowered simultaneously for the first time. The bridge was opened to traffic on October 17; at the time, work on the approaches was still ongoing, but operating machinery on the detour bridge failed, necessitating the bridge's removal to allow free passage of river traffic. The next year, the federal government completed its planned dredging of the Rouge River.

In the early 1980s, the county spent $2.2 million to repair portions of the West Jefferson Bridge (as well as doing similar work to the crossing at Dix Avenue). These repairs have somewhat altered the West Jefferson Bridge, but it retains its integrity as a significant example of early twentieth-century engineering.

On May 12, 2013, the West Jefferson Avenue bridge closed prematurely on the Lake Freighter Herbert C Jackson as a result of the bridge tender being intoxicated. This was the first incident of this type in the bridge's 91-year history. The bridge has been in the raised position since. Current plans are to repair the bridge and return it to service in 2016. The bridge was reopened on August 11, 2016.

See also

References

External links

Jefferson Avenue Bridge from historicBridges.org: numerous images

Bridges in Detroit
Towers in Michigan
Bridges completed in 1923
Road bridges on the National Register of Historic Places in Michigan
Streets in Michigan
National Register of Historic Places in Detroit
Bascule bridges in the United States
Drawbridges on the National Register of Historic Places
Steel bridges in the United States